Football Club Vast is a Ukrainian football team from the city of Mykolaiv. The club's name is known in Latin alphabet only.

History
The club's history starts in May of 2014 when as a football team it entered competitions of the city of Mykolaiv. The idea to create that team appeared in a local football family of Shymanets out of a populated place of Radsad and originally the team was called as Radsad. The original football club Radsad went bankrupt back in 2007, but its sports school (academy) continued to exist. The team was composed exclusively out of players from a local sports school (DYuSSh) in Radsad. After competing for few years in city and raion competitions, the family of Shymanets was joined by another football family of Teplyak to keep the team afloat. 

Starting from 2018 the team entered regional competitions of Mykolaiv Oblast and changed its name to current one after its main sponsor. The established club contains its first team, a futsal team, and its football academy. Along with regional competitions, the Vast main team continued to compete in city championship.

Since 2021, the club first appeared in AAFU national amateur competitions.

Participation of Vast in competitions of the Ukrainian PFL was known before the full-scale war with Russia in February of 2022. Due to the bombardment of Mykolaiv by Russians, the club was forced to relocate temporarily north to Irpin. On 16 May 2022, the vice-president of Vast acknowledged that there is not a part of Mykolaiv that was not bombarded by Russians.

Players

Current squad

League and cup history
{|class="wikitable"
|-bgcolor="#efefef"
! Season
! Div.
! Pos.
! Pl.
! W
! D
! L
! GS
! GA
! P
!Domestic Cup
!colspan=2|Europe
!Notes
|-
|align=center|2021–22
|align=center|4th Group 3
|align=center|4
|align=center|8
|align=center|2
|align=center|4
|align=center|2
|align=center|14
|align=center|16
|align=center|10
|align=center|
|align=center|
|align=center|
|align=center|
|-
|align=center|2022–23
|align=center|3rd
|align=center|
|align=center|
|align=center|
|align=center|
|align=center|
|align=center|
|align=center|
|align=center|
|align=center|
|align=center|
|align=center|
|align=center|
|}

Coaches
 2014–2020 Anton Shymanets
 2020 Volodymyr Zhdanyuk and Oleksandr Matrosov
 Anton Shymanets
 2021–2022 Artem Chorniy
 2022–present Dmytro Nazarenko

See also
 FC Enerhiya Mykolaiv

References

External links
 ВАСТ (Миколаїв): новий амбітний клуб великого футбольного міста. www.aafu.org.ua. 17.07.2021

 
Ukrainian Second League clubs
Vast Mykolaiv
Association football clubs established in 2014
2014 establishments in Ukraine
Sport in Mykolaiv